Hans Lindh (2 December 1930 – 17 April 1987) was a Swedish figure skater. As a single skater, he was an eleven-time Swedish national champion. He also competed in pair skating with Barbro Leidestam and Gun Mothander. Lindh became a coach in 1960, working at Djurgårdens IF and other clubs in the Stockholm region, and founded the Swedish figure skating coaching association. He died in an accident on 17 April 1987.

Competitive highlights

Single skating

Pair skating with Mothander

Pair skating with Leidestam

References 

1930 births
1987 deaths
Swedish male single skaters
Swedish male pair skaters
Sportspeople from Stockholm
Accidental deaths in Sweden